Crime Wave may refer to:

 An increase in crime - or perception of an increase in crime - in a particular period and place
 Crime Wave (1954 film), film starring Sterling Hayden
 "Crime Wave" (CSI episode), season 3 episode 8 of CSI Miami
 Crime Wave (book), a collection of short works by James Ellroy
 Crime Wave (1985 film), film aka The Big Crime Wave
 Crimewave, a 1985 film by Sam Raimi
 CrimeWave, a video game developed by Eidos Interactive
 Crime Wave (video game), a video game by Access Software
 "Crimewave" (song), a 2007 song by Crystal Castles and Health
 Crime Wave (2018 film), film directed by Gracia Querejeta
 "Crime Waves", one of The Zeta Project episodes (Season 1)